Giuseppe Marchesi (1699–1771) was an Italian painter of the Baroque period, active mainly in Bologna. He was also known as il Sansone for his herculean build. He was first a pupil of the painter Aureliano Milani and then of Marcantonio Franceschini.

Giuseppe Marchesi was born in Bologna on 19 July 1699.

His first teacher was the bolognese painter Aureliano Milani until 1719, when Milani left Bologna for Rome. 
So, Marchesi entered the workshop of Marcantonio Franceschini, at the time the best exponent of the classicist style in Bologna, and maybe in Europe, at least until the affirmation of Donato Creti.

From Aureliano Milani Giuseppe Marchesi borrowed Carracci's taste for some athletic male figures, and at the same time derived from Franceschini a wonderful lightness in representing images of women, children and angels, with a very personal style, that always maintained the ability of Franceschini to render clear complexions suffused with gentle redness and harmony in composition.

At the moment, are not known works realized while he was a pupil of Franceschini who, being of a particularly moderate nature, ended up driving the young Marchesi from his atelier because of the excessive vivacity of the latter's character.

"The Rape of Elena" is first work of sure dating was realised for the great hall of the Buratti house, in Bologna, in 1725, and so after the expulsion of Marchesi from Franceschini's workshop.

A little previous are to be considered the paintings with the Four Seasons (National Art Gallery of Bologna). These paintings, interpreting in a very personal way the Franceschini style, maintain the taste for the arcadic ambientation, but with a chromatic range that is detached from that of the master and leads back, rather, to Lorenzo Pasinelli, to reach a more refined naturalism in the "Nocturnal Winter", in which Marchesi experiments realistic and unusual games of light and shadows, that demonstrate, as the others three works, a knowledge of the Northern European Rococo painting. However, already "The rape of Elena" documents the start of the passage of Giuseppe Marchesi to what will be the second and central phase of his activity, in which, fascinated by the style of Vittorio Maria Bigari (Bologna 1692 - 1776), the "Sansone" will pass to very translucent colors, with slender figures, crystalline skyes and seas, and backgrounds of classic vertex architectures.

At this phase belong "Achilles takes leave of the Centaur Chiron" (Hinton Ampner, Hampshire) and "Clement VIII returns the keys of the city of Bologna to the Elders" (1739-1740), of the Civic Collections of Ancient Art of Bologna.

In the third and last period Giuseppe Marchesi, while remaining an excellent performer, will lose the compositional lightness that had characterized his youth and mature age, apparently due to a state of depression caused by the declining health of his wife.

He died in Bologna on 16 February 1771.

The Beccadelli House in Bologna has some ground floor rooms decorated by Vittorio Bigari (1692–1776) and Marchesi. The Zambeccari Library, formerly of the Jesuit order, was decorated by Nicola Bertuzzi and Marchesi as figure painters, Pietro Scandelari in quadratura and Antonio Calegari as stuccoist. Among his pupils was Antonio Peracchi.

References

1699 births
1771 deaths
18th-century Italian painters
Italian male painters
Italian Baroque painters
Rococo painters
18th-century Italian male artists